Tom Karalis (born May 24, 1964) is a Canadian-American former ice hockey defenceman.

Karalis played in the American Hockey League for the Fredericton Express, Baltimore Skipjacks, New Haven Nighthawks, Moncton Hawks and Binghamton Rangers. He also played in the International Hockey League for the Muskegon Lumberjacks, Flint Spirits, Indianapolis Ice, Phoenix Roadrunners, Peoria Rivermen and Fort Wayne Komets. He won two CHL championships with the Tulsa Oilers in 1993 and 1994.

Karalis moved to Europe in 1994, playing in France for Brest Albatros Hockey and Ducs d'Angers, Austria for EV VSV and Germany for SC Bietigheim-Bissingen before returning to the Tulsa Oilers for a second spell during the 1997–98 season, his final season before retiring.

Karalis kept residence in Tulsa after retirement and later became an American citizen.

Career statistics

References

External links

1964 births
Living people
Baltimore Skipjacks players
SC Bietigheim-Bissingen players
Binghamton Rangers players
Brest Albatros Hockey players
Canadian ice hockey defencemen
Canadian people of Greek descent
Drummondville Voltigeurs players
Ducs d'Angers players
Flint Spirits players
Fort Wayne Komets players
Fredericton Express players
Indianapolis Ice players
Moncton Hawks players
Murrayfield Racers players
Muskegon Lumberjacks players
New Haven Nighthawks players
People with acquired American citizenship
Peoria Rivermen (IHL) players
Phoenix Roadrunners (IHL) players
Shawinigan Cataractes players
Ice hockey people from Montreal
Tulsa Oilers (1992–present) players
EC VSV players
Wichita Thunder players
Canadian emigrants to the United States
Canadian expatriate ice hockey players in the United States
Canadian expatriate ice hockey players in Scotland
Canadian expatriate ice hockey players in France
Canadian expatriate ice hockey players in Austria
Canadian expatriate ice hockey players in Germany